Daniel Estrada (born 27 February 1990) is a Chilean long distance runner who specialises in the marathon. He competed in the men's marathon event at the 2016 Summer Olympics.

References

External links
 

1990 births
Living people
Chilean male long-distance runners
Chilean male marathon runners
Place of birth missing (living people)
Athletes (track and field) at the 2016 Summer Olympics
Olympic athletes of Chile